Jermaine La Jaune Jackson (born December 11, 1954) is an American singer-songwriter and bassist. He is best known for being a member of the Jackson family. From 1964 to 1975, Jermaine was second vocalist after his brother Michael of the Jackson 5, and played bass guitar. Since 1983 he rejoined the group, now known as the Jacksons.

Jermaine sang the lead on some of The Jackson Five's biggest hits, and featured in "I'll Be There" and "I Want You Back" amongst others. When the four others left and had to reform as The Jacksons, Jermaine, who had just married Motown founder Berry Gordy's daughter Hazel, stayed at Motown and was replaced by his youngest brother, Randy. Jermaine had a solo career concurrent with his brother Michael's and some top-30 hits until the 1980s, produced and recorded duets with Whitney Houston at her debut in 1985, and was a producer for the band Switch. After seven years he rejoined The Jacksons and remained throughout their various breakups and reunions.

Early life
Jermaine was born December 11, 1954, at St Mary's Mercy Hospital in Gary, Indiana, after his brother Tito Jackson. He is the fourth child born to Joseph and Katherine Jackson. His siblings are Rebbie, Jackie, Tito, La Toya, Marlon, Brandon (Marlon's twin who died shortly after birth in 1957), Michael, Randy, and Janet. Father, Joe had musical aspirations, playing guitar with his brother Luther in an R&B band, the Falcons, and mother Katherine a devout Jehovah's Witness was a passionate pianist and singer,. Their large family and limited means made them refocus, with Katherine becoming a housewife and Joe a steel mill worker at nearby Inland Steel Company in East Chicago, Indiana, where they lived before moving to Gary in 1950. 

When his father, Joe worked long hours as a crane operator, Jermaine and his brothers, Tito and Jackie, secretly practiced their own songs using Joe's guitar, and they sang harmonies with mother Katherine . Jermaine became the original lead singer, and also played the bass in the Jackson Brothers, an earlier incarnation of the Jackson 5 until 1966, when younger brother Michael began singing lead. Father Joe began rehearsing his sons under a strict regimen when he realized their potential, seeing his sons’ talent as a way out of Gary.  Jermaine would continue to provide some leads over the years. Jermaine graduated from Birmingham High School in Van Nuys, Los Angeles, California, in 1973.

Career

The Jackson 5

Jermaine and his brothers first signed as The Jackson 5 with Gordon Keith of Steeltown Records in November 1967, and their first single "Big Boy", was released on January 31, 1968. After the group recorded three more songs with the Steeltown label (on two records) they were signed with Berry Gordy of Motown Records in 1969. As the co-lead singer of The Jackson 5 after his brother Michael, Jermaine sang notable parts of "I Want You Back", "ABC", "I'll Be There", "The Love You Save", "Dancing Machine", and many other Jackson 5 songs. Jermaine performed as part of the group for six years. Not feeling that they were being paid fair royalties by Motown Records for their success as well as their desire for creative control, the Jackson 5 decided to leave the label and sign with Epic Records in 1975. However, Jermaine decided to stay with Motown Records, citing loyalty to the company as the reason. Others argue that Jermaine's marriage to Motown founder Berry Gordy's daughter Hazel, whom he married in 1973, was a deciding factor. 

Jermaine split from the Jackson Five to start a solo career at Motown, and was replaced by his brother Randy Jackson. Unbeknownst to the group, Gordy had trademarked the name The Jackson Five and did not allow the group to continue using the name when they left the label. Once signed with Epic, the group became known simply as The Jacksons. In 1983, Gordy asked the group to perform at the Motown 25: Yesterday, Today, Forever television special. After the success of the broadcast, Jermaine finally rejoined the band to record the album Victory which featured all six brothers on the Jackson's album cover. Jermaine also participated in the band's Victory Tour. He stayed with the group for their final album, 2300 Jackson Street, in 1989. 
Jermaine performs the song If You'd Only Believe, from their 2300 Jackson Street album, on March 15, 1993, with his brothers Jackie, Tito and Randy, on the stage of the Grand Théâtre de Genève for the evening of the Nations. He also performed this song alone, on January 14, 1990, in Atlanta, in tribute to Martin Luther King, during King Week 90 '. In 1997, he was inducted into the Rock and Roll Hall of Fame with the Jackson 5. In 2001, he reunited with his brothers to perform for the Michael Jackson 30th Anniversary Special.

Solo career
Like Michael, Jermaine began a solo career while still a member of The Jackson 5, and had a hit with the 1972 Shep and the Limelites cover "Daddy's Home". It sold over one million copies by March 1973, and was awarded a gold disc. When The Jackson 5 left Motown in 1975, Jermaine left the group and stayed at the label until 1983, when he finally rejoined his brothers for the Motown 25 television special, and their album Victory the following year. Jermaine was nominated for the Grammy Award for Best Male R&B Vocal Performance for his 1980 album Let's Get Serious. He had a number of Billboard top-30 hits throughout the 1970s and 1980s, including "Daddy's Home" (No. 9), "That's How Love Goes", "Let's Be Young Tonight", "Bass Odyssey", "Feel the Fire", "Let Me Tickle Your Fancy" (featuring Devo on backing vocals) (No. 18), "Let's Get Serious" (No. 9, also one of his only two UK hits, peaking at No. 8), "Dynamite" (No. 15), "Do What You Do" (No. 13), and "I Think It's Love" (No. 16). A duet with his brother Michael, "Tell Me I'm Not Dreamin' (Too Good to Be True)", hit number one on the dance chart in 1984. Michael and he also collaborated with Rockwell, both providing guest vocals on his 1984 hit single, "Somebody's Watching Me".

In 1985, his duet with Pia Zadora, "When the Rain Begins to Fall", topped several singles charts in Europe. His final chart success, 1989's "Don't Take It Personal", hit number one on the R&B singles chart. Some of Jermaine's finest moments as a singer can be heard in the soulful "Castles of Sand" and the Earth Wind & Fire-inspired "You Need To Be Loved". Jermaine was the executive producer of The Jackson Family Honors concert televised from the MGM Grand on February 22, 1994 . On May 19, 2003, he performed "Let's Start Right Now" live on the talk show "The View", hosted by Barbara Walters. 

Jackson is proficient on the electric guitar and is a talented bass guitar player. At an early age, he performed the parts of legendary bass player James Jamerson and others when the Five performed live. His main instrument was a Gibson EB-3. Jermaine also composed and produced for other artists, such as Switch and he produced and sang duets on Whitney Houston's debut album for Arista Records. Jackson is featured on the Switch track "Tahiti Hut" released in 2019, recorded during the Reaching For Tomorrow sessions.

Reality television
Jackson was the first housemate to enter the Celebrity Big Brother 5 house in 2007, which he placed 2nd. After leaving Big Brother, Jackson did several interviews on UK television explaining why and how he took his peaceful and mediating stance in the Big Brother house. He also spoke about the Jackson Five reuniting for a performance. Jackson was part of the second season of the CMT reality show Gone Country. On the premiere episode of season three of the ABC reality show Celebrity Wife Swap on April 15, 2014, Jackson and his wife Halima swapped places with Daniel Baldwin and his on-again, off-again girlfriend Isabella Hofmann.

Later work

In April 2007, Jackson returned to the UK to take part in a one-off special of ITV's Challenge Anneka. On the same trip, he appeared in Glasgow with British Prime Minister Gordon Brown, speaking in support of Searchlight magazine's anti racism campaign, the Daily Mirror "Hope Not Hate bus".

On November 23, 2007, Jackson appeared on Katie & Peter: Unleashed and again talked of a reunion with his brothers on a tour the following year. In 2008, Jackson flew to Australia to be a guest judge and mentor for the top-five Michael Jackson night on Australian Idol. In March 2008, Jackson was the guest of honor at the Muslim Writers Awards in Birmingham. In 2009, following his brother Michael's passing, Jermaine appeared on the A&E television series The Jacksons: A Family Dynasty, documenting what was supposed to be a 40th-anniversary reunion between Jermaine and his brothers. The series lasted one season and Jermaine, along with his three brothers, was listed as an executive producer. In October 2010, Jermaine played a concert at the Planet Hollywood hotel and casino in Las Vegas, naming it "40 Years of Jackson Music" and dedicating the concert to Michael. He wrote the memoir You Are Not Alone: Michael Through a Brother's Eyes (2011).

In a 2012 interview with Luka Neskovic, for The Huffington Post, Jackson said that his brother planned a reunion with him: "... the plan was to do some shows with the brothers, as well, after he finished his commitment with the "This Is It" [concert], and we probably gonna do some songs with him on the "This Is It" tour". In October 2012, Jackson released I Wish You Love, his first solo album in 21 years, consisting mostly of jazz covers. The album was arranged and produced by French opera singer David Serero, who recorded a duet on "Autumn Leaves" with Jermaine, and was released by David Serero Productions. They both performed You Are Not Alone: The Musical, written, directed and produced by Serero, in France in January 2013. The following year, You Are Not Alone: The Musical Live was released on video and audio.

Personal life

Family
Jackson has been married and divorced three times, and has seven children. His first marriage was to Motown founder Berry Gordy's daughter, Hazel Gordy (born August 24, 1954), which lasted from December 15, 1973 until 1988. He has three children with Hazel: 
 Jermaine La Jaune "Jay" Jackson Jr., (born January 27, 1977). Jermaine Jr. and his longtime girlfriend, Asa Soltan Rahmati, have a son, Soltan Soul Jackson, born on January 20, 2017.
 Autumn Joi Jackson (born June 16, 1978), married to producer Narinder Singh.
 Jaimy Jermaine Jackson (born March 17, 1987).

Jackson was in a relationship with Margaret Maldonado from 1986 until 1993. They have two sons: 
 Jeremy Maldonado Jackson (born December 26, 1986).
 Jourdynn Michael Jackson (born January 5, 1989): Jourdynn is married to Marike Le Roux.

He began a relationship with Alejandra Genevieve Oaziaza while she was dating his younger brother Randy, with whom she had a daughter and a son. He married Oaziaza on March 18, 1995, and the marriage lasted until May 19, 2003. They have two sons: 
 Jaafar Jermiah Jackson (born July 25, 1996). 
 Jermajesty Jermaine Jackson (born October 7, 2000).

In January 2004, Jackson met Halima Rashid while in line at Starbucks. In March 2004, he proposed to her and five months later, they were married in a mosque in Los Angeles. Rashid was arrested on November 28, 2015, in Los Angeles for alleged domestic violence. Rashid filed a petition for divorce on June 21, 2016, citing irreconcilable differences.

Jermaine supported his brother, Michael, during the 2005 trial. He came to Michael's defense on CNN's Larry King Live and appeared with him in court on many occasions. On June 25, 2009, Jermaine held a press conference at Ronald Reagan UCLA Medical Center, and broke the news of Michael Jackson's passing to the media.

Jermaine is a supporter of the English football team Sheffield Wednesday.

Michael's memorial
Jermaine thanked the people that attended Michael Jackson memorial at the Staples Center, on July 7, 2009. “As you know,” he said, “I am lost for words. I had his back. So did the family. But we thank you. That’s all I can say. We thank you very much.“ Jermaine also tossed a rose on Michael’s casket, after he sang "Smile" by Charlie Chaplin, which Michael also had covered and released.   In honor of Michael, Jermaine and his brothers, Tito, Jackie, Marlon and Randy Jackson served as pallbearers wearing a gold necktie, a single white glove and sunglasses. 

On January 30, 2019, Jermaine spoke out about the allegations against Michael, "Michael was tried by a jury of his peers and he was acquitted." he said. He added: "There was no real evidence, and I will say this - our family are tired. Let this man rest. He did a lot for the world. There is no truth to this. We're living in a time where people can say anything and it's taken as truth." BBC News reported.

Conversion to Islam
Jackson, like the rest of his family, was raised as a Jehovah's Witness. In 1989, he converted to Islam after a trip to Bahrain, in which he was impressed by the local children's devotion to their religion. 

Jermaine claimed in an interview that if his brother Michael had converted to Islam, it would have saved his life.

In popular culture
 He was voiced by Joel Cooper on the 1971-72 animated series The Jackson 5ive.
 He was portrayed by his son, Jermaine Jackson Jr., and Colin Steele in the 1992 miniseries The Jacksons: An American Dream.
 He was portrayed by Jason Griffith in the 2004 film Man in the Mirror: The Michael Jackson Story.
 He was portrayed by Kenan Thompson in a 2010 skit on the sketch comedy show Saturday Night Live.
 In the NBC television show Parks and Recreation episodes from S04E22 and S07E03, the ballroom at the convention center is named "Jermaine Jackson Memorial Ballroom".
 He was portrayed by Romeo Balentine in the 2019 TV One movie The Bobby DeBarge Story.

Discography

 Jermaine (1972)
 Come into My Life (1973)
 My Name Is Jermaine (1976)
 Feel the Fire (1977)
 Frontiers (1978)
 Let's Get Serious (1980)
 Jermaine (1980)
 I Like Your Style (1981)
 Let Me Tickle Your Fancy (1982)
 Dynamite (1984)
 Precious Moments (1986)
 Don't Take It Personal (1989)
 You Said (1991)
 I Wish You L.O.V.E (2012)

Music videos 
"Do What You Do"
"You Said, You Said"
"Don't Take It Personal"
"I Dream, I Dream"
"Two Ships (In the Night)"
"I Think It's Love"
"Dynamite"
"Let's Be Young"
"When the Rain Begins to Fall"
"Sweetest, Sweetest"

Filmography

Tours
Precious Moments Tour (1986)
Jermaine Jackson Australian Tour (1987–88)

References

External links

 
 
 

 
1954 births
Living people
20th-century American guitarists
20th-century American singers
21st-century American singers
21st-century American memoirists
African-American male guitarists
African-American male singers
African-American male singer-songwriters
African-American Muslims
American contemporary R&B singers
American dance musicians
American funk bass guitarists
American funk guitarists
American funk singers
American male bass guitarists
American male pop singers
American male singer-songwriters
American rhythm and blues bass guitarists
American rhythm and blues guitarists
American rhythm and blues singers
American rhythm and blues singer-songwriters
American soul guitarists
American soul singers
Arista Records artists
Birmingham High School alumni
Child pop musicians
Converts to Islam
Epic Records artists
Former Jehovah's Witnesses
Guitarists from Indiana
Jackson family (show business)
LaFace Records artists
Male bass guitarists
Motown artists
Musicians from Gary, Indiana
Singer-songwriters from Indiana
The Jackson 5 members